E przewalskii may refer to:
Equus przewalskii (Przewalski's horse)
Eolagurus przewalskii (Przewalski's steppe lemming)
Ephedra przewalskii